Bernhard-Viktor Christoph-Carl von Bülow (12 November 1923 – 22 August 2011), known as Vicco von Bülow or Loriot, was a German comedian, humorist, cartoonist, film director, actor and writer.

He was best known for his cartoons, the sketches from his 1976 television series Loriot, alongside Evelyn Hamann, and his two movies, Ödipussi (1988) and Pappa Ante Portas (1991).

On the television series Unsere Besten (Our Best), Loriot was ranked the 54th best German ever. In a special comedy episode of Unsere Besten, he was ranked as the most famous German comedian ever.

Early life and personal life

Vicco von Bülow was born in Brandenburg an der Havel in Prussia, today Brandenburg, in modern north-eastern Germany. The von Bülow family belongs to German aristocracy. His parents, Johann-Albrecht Wilhelm von Bülow (1899–1972) and Charlotte (née von Roeder, 1899–1929), separated soon after he was born, and his mother died when he was six. Von Bülow and his brother grew up in Berlin with their grandmother.

Von Bülow was still in school when World War II started. After graduating early from secondary school, he followed the family's tradition and became a military officer. He was deployed to the Eastern Front for three years, serving as Oberleutnant of Panzergrenadierregiment 3 in the 3rd Panzer Division. He was decorated with the Iron Cross 2nd class and 1st class. His younger brother, Johann-Albrecht Sigismund von Bülow, was killed on 21 March 1945, less than two months before the end of World War II. Asked during an interview later in his life if he had been a good soldier he answered: "Not good enough, otherwise I would have been part of the resistance on 20 July 1944. But for the dreadful German contribution to world history, I will be ashamed for the rest of my life."

Von Bülow completed his Abitur in 1946. In 1951 he married Romi Schlumbom (born 1929), with whom he had two daughters.

Artistic career

Von Bülow's talent for drawing was eminent already during his school years. After the war he studied graphic design and painting at the Landeskunstschule in Hamburg. From 1950 onwards, he published cartoons under the pseudonym "Loriot", derived from the French word for oriole, his family's heraldic animal.

In 1971, von Bülow created a cartoon dog named , which he voice acted himself. Wum became the mascot of Aktion Sorgenkind, a German humanitarian organization. During the Christmas season of 1972 Wum's song "Ich wünsch' mir 'ne kleine Miezekatze" ("I wish I had a little kittycat"), sung in sprechgesang style, became popular enough to remain in the top position of the German pop charts for nine weeks. Wum also appeared in the German show  (The Big Prize), where he appeared during breaks until the 1990s. Before long, Wum was accompanied by the elephant Wendelin, and later by Blauer Klaus (Blue Klaus), an alien hovering in with his flying saucer. Loriot wrote, drew and dubbed all of these skits by himself. Each cartoon ended with Loriot asking the viewers to take part in the TV-lottery, which supported the "Aktion Sorgenkind". When the show was dropped, the adventures of Wum and Wendelin ended as well. Today, Wum and Wendelin appear on the last page of the TV magazine Gong.

The first episode of the German television comedy series Loriot was produced in 1976. In six episodes, Loriot presented sketches, usually being the protagonist himself, and short cartoons, drawn by himself. Examples of sketches from the series include Der Lottogewinner ("The lottery winner"), Jodeldiplom ("yodeling diploma") and Englische Ansage ("English announcement").

Loriot had a love of classical music and opera. In 1982, he conducted the humorous gala concert for the 100th anniversary of the Berlin Philharmonic Orchestra. He is also related to the orchestra's history by kinship (Hans von Bülow, the first chief conductor of the orchestra, was distantly related to Loriot). His narrative version of Camille Saint-Saëns' The Carnival of the Animals was repeatedly performed by Loriot with the Scharoun Ensemble, a chamber music ensemble consisting of musicians of the Berlin Philharmonic Orchestra.

As a director, Loriot staged the operas Martha (Staatsoper Stuttgart, 1986) and Der Freischütz (Ludwigsburg, 1988). In 1983 Radio Bremen produced the broadcast "Loriot's 60th birthday" for the broadcast station ARD on the occasion of Loriot's 60th birthday. In 1988 he received the Bavarian Film Award, Special Prize, and in 1993 the Bavarian Film Award, Honorary Award.

Loriot was awarded an honorary doctorate by the University of Wuppertal in 2001. He is honorary citizen of his hometown of Brandenburg an der Havel and his chosen home of Münsing from 1993 until his death. Furthermore, Loriot was a member of the Bayerische Akademie der Schönen Künste since that same year and of the Berlin Academy of Arts since 1997. He became honorary professor of theatrical arts at the Berlin University of the Arts in June 2003. He received numerous awards for his performance in TV, movies and other disciplines. He died in Ammerland at Lake Starnberg of old age.

Characteristics of his work

His cartoons hinged on the contrast between the presented situation, the dignity displayed by his typically big nosed characters and the picture's caption. Inevitably one of these elements gets out of line, for example, when he combines the caption "We demand equal treatment of men and women, even if the suckling baby might temporarily lose weight." with the picture of a bulbous-nosed man breast-feeding a baby in a distinguished manner. The topics of his cartoons were mainly drawn from everyday life, scenes of the family and middle-class society. The same contrast between absurd situation and dignified behaviour of his characters could be seen in his various sketches and films.

Loriot's enormous popularity, his accurate language, and high-brow sense of comedy led to the adoption of a large number of phrases and inventions from the series' sketches into German common knowledge and everyday speech. Among these are certainly the "yodeling diploma", a sentence like "With that," (said diploma) "you have something of your own!", "the "stone louse", but also remarks like, "Please ... don't talk right now.", "There used to be more tinsel!", "Look, a piano! A piano, a piano!" or the laconic, hardly translatable "Ach!?" ("Oh, is it?").

Lawsuit against Wikimedia Foundation for copyright violation

Pictures showing Loriot's signature and German semi-postal stamps with topics of Loriot's work that illustrated Loriot's entry in the German-language Wikipedia were removed by the Wikimedia Foundation on 8 November 2011. This action was prompted by an interim order forbidding Wikimedia to use these images, that had been initiated by an heiress, daughter Susanne von Bülow, at the Landgericht Berlin on 6 October 2011 after an email from the heiress requesting their removal had not been answered. Wikimedia had to pay the cost of the legal proceedings. The final court decision was announced on 27 March 2012; it upheld the interim order regarding the stamps, but overturned it for the signature. Wikimedia was ordered to pay  of the costs.

Accolades and awards (selection)

 1943: Iron Cross 1st and 2nd Class
 1968 & 1973: Adolf Grimme Award in silver
 1973: Goldene Europa
 1974: Grand Merit Cross of the Federal Republic of Germany
 1974: Karl-Valentin Medal
 1978: Goldene Kamera
 1980: Bavarian Order of Merit
 1985: Kassel Literary Prize
 1988 & 1993: Bambi
 1990: Order of Merit of Berlin
 1993: Membership in the Bayerische Akademie der Schönen Künste
 1993: Honorary citizenship of his native home town of Brandenburg an der Havel and his chosen home town of Münsing
 1995: Bavarian Maximilian Order for Science and Art
 1997: Membership in the Academy of Arts, Berlin
 1998: Grand Merit Cross with Star
 2001: Honorary degree from the University of Wuppertal
 2003: Honorary professorship at the Berlin University of the Arts
 2007: German Comedy Awards Honorary Award
 2007: Wilhelm Busch Prize
 2009: Honorary Award of the Deutsche Filmakademie
 2009: Walk of Fame of Cabaret
 2010: Honorary membership in the German Sociological Association
 2011: Charity stamps of four well-known Loriot cartoons
 2015: Hörzu readers' award for "greatest TV legend"

References

External links

 
 
 
 

1923 births
2011 deaths
People from Brandenburg an der Havel
German male comedians
German opera directors
German cartoonists
German comedians
German male television actors
German male film actors
German Army officers of World War II
German untitled nobility
Mass media people from Brandenburg
Radio Bremen people
Bülow family
University of Fine Arts of Hamburg alumni
Academic staff of the Berlin University of the Arts
Recipients of the Iron Cross (1939), 1st class
Recipients of the Iron Cross (1939), 2nd class
Knights Commander of the Order of Merit of the Federal Republic of Germany
Recipients of the Order of Merit of Berlin
20th-century German male actors